Fuad Ricardo Char Abdala (born 5 October 1937) is a Senator of Colombia serving his fifth term in Congress, albeit not all consecutively.

Family
Fuad was the son of Ricardo Char Zaslawy, an immigrant from Lebanon who arrived in Colombia in 1926, and Erlinda Abdala a daughter of Lebanese immigrants. He is the eldest out of seven children, his other siblings were Jabib, Farid, Simón, and, Ricardo 

His uncle, Nicólas had started a business that quickly grew profitable, and the family moved to Barranquilla in 1952, where they started what would become , a conglomerate that would make his family one of the most influential in the Colombian Caribbean Coast. It grew into a conglomerate that included Supermercados Olimpicos, the radio station Olímpica Stéreo, and the ownership of Junior Barranquilla. 

Fuad, married his first cousin Adela Chaljub Char, daughter of Antonio Chaljub, an immigrant from Lebanon and Rosa Char Zaslawy, his aunt from Syria. Together they had three children: Antonio, Arturo, and Alejandro. After becoming a widower in 1994, he remarried in 2004 to Maria Mercedes de la Espriella.

Currently, the Char family is considered one of the most influential families in Colombia, with Alejandro (Fuad's son) being major of Barranquilla in two non-consecutive times, and Arturo being Senator of Colombia during the period 2018-2022. Nevertheless, The Char family has been accused multiple times of corruption acts that involve all types of electoral crimes. Recently, the Char family was on the public eye as Aida Merlano (Former senator and Fugitive), affirmed that the Char family arranged her cinematographic escape from jail and her posterior attempt of murder.

See also
 Roberto Gerlein Echeverría
 José Name Terán

References

1937 births
People from Córdoba Department
Living people
Fuad
Colombian people of Lebanese descent
Members of the Senate of Colombia
Colombian Ministers of Economic Development
Governors of Atlántico Department
Ambassadors of Colombia to Portugal